Roberto Rosario Gonzalez; is a Puerto Rican software engineer, best known for his work evangelising and promoting Free Software use and creation in the government of Puerto Rico, and for his initiatives towards citizen open access to government data as well as civic hacking promotion. He is also a civil rights activist and privacy advocate, creating software in one instance specifically designed to circumvent the measures proposed by the SOPA legislation. He promotes the increase of students into STEM careers by sponsoring and volunteering at student hackathons  and also by sponsoring groups that work towards increasing the number of women into STEM fields.

Career
Graduated from Adolfo Camarillo High School in Camarillo, California. Has a bachelor of science - BS Mechanical Engineering from Northern Arizona University. On April 14, 2015, Rosario announced the creation of Python Latino, an initiative to create the Latinamerican Python community. He is currently the main organizer of the initiative. As an extension of his desire to help create and grow the Latinamerican Python community, Rosario on April 30, 2015, announced his intention to run in the 2015 Python Software Foundation Board of Directors election. Being the first PSF candidate of Latino origins, his move has been applauded by members of the Python community, specially for his desire to turn PyCon Cuba from a joke  into a reality.

Controversies 

In August, 2012 it was discovered that there were companies redistributing the software Mayan EDMS under terms that violated the software's license. Roberto Rosario as copyright holder of the software in question made the discovery public which resulted in a discussion of the rights of the copyright holders under the GPL license.

Current Status 

As of March 2019, he posted an announcement on one of his projects.

I have come to the decision to shut down all my projects.

I have been a software developer for 33 years and it saddens deeply me to see what has become of the industry that formed the basis of my identity for so long.

Due to many situations (some of which are already public knowledge and others that are not), I don't want to be associated with Python or Django (projects, organizations, and events). I can't in good conscience continue to put by weight and support (economic and technical) behind them. I have also stopped attending Django and Python events as a speaker or attendee. The risks and costs outweight the benefits. Many of them are not even about Python or Django anymore.
I've moved on and software development is no longer my main source of income. As such maintaining so many projects is a drain of my resources and time. I'm shutting down all active projects and closing or restricting the few social media accounts that have not yet censored me. I will only continue to participate in Mayan EDMS due to the huge number of people that rely on it and have supported it over the 8 years of its existence. If I ever release new projects in the future I would do so under pseudonyms to protect myself and those who support me.

Thank you very much for the huge support during these past years I wish things would have ended up differently. I have some faith that things will improve in the future as the industry self-corrects.

Best regards,

Roberto Rosario

References

American software engineers
Living people
Puerto Rican engineers
Northern Arizona University alumni
Year of birth missing (living people)